Tour de Borobudur (abbreviated TDB) is a cycling race, which is held annually in Central Java, Indonesia. The race has been held since 2000. It is an annual sport-cum-tourist event, and sharing social activities in which cyclists ride along a route that passes by tourist spots in Central Java such as Sam Poo Kong Temple in Semarang, Kreo Cave, Mount Merapi, and Lake Rawa Pening.

The race is organized as three categories, namely A (200 km), B (100 km) and VVIP. The race starts at Semarang City Hall, and end point of all categories is at Borobudur Temple.

External links

References

Central Java 
Cycle races in Indonesia
Tourist attractions in Central Java
Annual events in Indonesia